Cardiff won the inaugural Welsh-Scottish League. However they lost their final match against Swansea at home thus losing an unbeaten home record that dated back to December 1997. The points system was complicated by the Rugby World Cup and only two points were awarded for a win prior to November 1999. Both Cardiff and Pontypridd were deducted points by playing Edinburgh during this World Cup period; although the matches were scheduled to take place outwith the World Cup.

1999-2000 League Table

The top 5 Welsh teams plus Edinburgh and Glasgow qualified for next season's Heineken Cup.

Results

Round 1

Round 2

Round 3

Round 4

Round 5

Round 6

Round 7

Round 8

Round 9

Round 10

Round 11

Round 12

Round 5 rescheduled match

Round 13

Round 14

Round 13 rescheduled match

Round 15

Round 14 rescheduled match

Round 16

Round 13 rescheduled match

Round 15 rescheduled match

Round 17

Round 15 rescheduled matches

Round 10 rescheduled match

Round 18

Round 15 rescheduled match

Round 19

Round 20

Round 14 rescheduled match

Round 21

Round 15 rescheduled match

Round 22

Round 21 rescheduled match

References

1999–2000
1999–2000 in Scottish rugby union
1999–2000 in Welsh rugby union
1999–2000 in British rugby union
1999–2000 in European rugby union leagues